Kim or Kimberly Williams may refer to:

People
Kimberly Williams-Paisley (born 1971), American actress
Kimberly Williams (triple jumper) (born 1988), Jamaican triple jumper
Kimberly Williams (politician), American politician in the state of Delaware
Kim Williams (architect), American independent scholar of architecture and mathematics
Kim Williams (writer) (1923–1986), American naturalist and writer
Kim Williams (media executive) (born 1952), Australian media executive
Kim Williams (songwriter) (1947–2016), American country music songwriter
Kim Williams (basketball) (born 1974), American former professional basketball player
Kim A. Williams Sr. (born 1955), American cardiologist
Kimberly Irene "Kim" Williams, one of conspirators of the 2013 Kaufman County murders

Other uses
Kim Williams, a character in the American film Another Earth

See also
Kimberly Williamson (born 1993), a Jamaican athlete